Mill Island is an uninhabited Arctic island located in Hudson Bay between Foxe Channel and Hudson Strait. It is south of Baffin Island's Foxe Peninsula, and north of Nottingham and Salisbury islands. Mill Island is part of the Qikiqtaaluk Region of the Canadian territory of Nunavut.

Putnam Island is a smaller island, less than a kilometre away, off the east coast of Mill Island. Another small island, unnamed, is off the west coast of Mill Island, separated by Hurin Throughlet.

References
 Sea islands: Atlas of Canada; Natural Resources Canada

Islands of Baffin Island
Islands of Hudson Strait
Uninhabited islands of Qikiqtaaluk Region